God Reward You (Dios se lo pague) is a 1948 Argentine drama film directed by Luis César Amadori and starring Arturo de Córdova and Zully Moreno.  It won the Silver Condor Award for Best Film, given by the Argentine Film Critics Association in 1949 for the best picture of the previous year.

In a survey of the 100 greatest films of Argentine cinema carried out by the Museo del Cine Pablo Ducrós Hicken in 2000, the film reached the 14th position. In 2022, the film was included in Spanish magazine Fotogramass list of the 20 best Argentine films of all time.

Plot 

Nancy, a woman gambler who frequents underground casinos, who flaunts her elegance to hide her poverty while waiting for a wealthy man to appear and take care of her, talks to an old man begging at the door of a casino. Shortly after, a rich and mysterious man offers her a life of luxury, albeit far from social conventions. He does not want to marry or tell her anything about his life; In return, he offers her luxuries and everything she has dreamed of all her life.

She also meet the son of a very important textile businessman, who becomes obsessed with her and begins to persecute her. He proposes that they run away together, and even steals to finance her escape to the United States.

The day they were supposed to leave, the husband doesn't leave the house at the usual time and Nancy gets scared. The beggar and the husband turn out to be the same person. She decides not to leave him and instead goes to the church, where the beggar begs for alms. They both get married.

Cast
Arturo de Córdova
Zully Moreno
Florindo Ferrario
Enrique Chaico
Federico Mansilla
Zoe Ducós
José Comellas
Roberto Bordoni
Ramón Garay
Tito Grassi
Adolfo Linvel
José Antonio Paonessa
Enrique de Pedro
Nicolás Taricano
Aída Villadeamigo

Awards 

The movie won 5 Awards from the Argentine Academy of Cinematography Arts and Sciences:

 Best Film (Mejor película).
 Best Director (Mejor director)
 Best Actress (Mejor actriz protagónica): Zully Moreno
 Best Actor (Mejor actor protagónico): Arturo de Córdova
 Best Supporting Actress (Mejor actriz de reparto): Enrique Chaico 

In addition, the movie also won 3 academic plates and diplomas:

 Sound: Tulio Demicheli, Alberto Etchebehere, Juan Ehlert, Mario Fezia and Carlos Marín.
 Editing: Jorge Garate.
 Filming: Roque Giacovino.
The movie won the Best Argentine film award at the Hispano-American Contest of Madrid

1981 telenovela 

In 1981 ATC (Argentina Televisora Color) broadcast the telenovela Dios se lo pague adapted by Vicente Sesso and directed by Alberto Rinaldi. The telenovela starred Víctor Hugo Vieyra, Leonor Benedetto, Federico Luppi, Gloria Antier, Susy Kent, Gianni Lunadei and Juan Peña.

References

External links
 
Article at the Universidad de Antioquia website 

1948 films
1940s Spanish-language films
1948 drama films
Argentine black-and-white films
Argentine drama films
Argentine telenovelas
1981 telenovelas
Films directed by Luis César Amadori
Films with screenplays by Tulio Demicheli
1940s Argentine films